Anthony's Cross is a hamlet in Gloucestershire, England.

External links

Hamlets in Gloucestershire
Newent